Keith Robert Boanas (born 22 April 1959) is an English football manager.

Playing career
Boanas has played and coached on the semi-professional circuit, Boanas made three substitute appearances for Tooting & Mitcham United after being appointed manager in 1998–99.

Coaching career
Boanas is currently the president of Surrey Coaches Association UK, replacing the late Sir Bobby Robson.

Prior to taking the Tooting & Mitcham United head coach position in 1998, he had become The County Coach in England's Surrey County Football Association. He also served as director of Margate FC's centre of excellence.

Boanas has worked with and assisted in the development of many senior England women internationals such as current captain Casey Stoney and Enila Aluko. He has also assisted his wife, Pauline Cope-Boanas and Marieanne Spacey, the former assistant England national coach whom he tutored for the English FA Level 2, UEFA B.
Boanas has also worked with many figures from the men's game including Chris Powell, the current head coach at Charlton Athletic and former PFA president. His career has included working with former Premier league goalkeeper Dean Kiely, now a coach at West Bromwich Albion, and Simon Mcmenmy, who was a national manager of the Philippines national team, and in player development, Leroy Lita who played for Swansea City, and Jason Euel who played for Charlton Athletic.

In November 2000, Boanas took over as manager of Charlton Athletic Ladies, while still managing Tooting & Mitcham United FC. In August 2001, Boanas furthered his role with Charlton Athletic Ladies, resigning from his role at Tooting & Mitcham.

With Charlton Ladies, Boanas alongside his assistant Matt Beard reached three successive FA Women's Cup finals, winning the 2005 trophy after defeats to Fulham in 2003 and Arsenal in 2004. He reached the final once again in 2007. He also guided Charlton Ladies to further cup success in the FA Women's Premier League Cup in 2004 and 2006.

Despite the success of Charlton Ladies team, 2007 saw the Charlton Athletic men's team relegated from the Premier League and they scrapped their entire women's section as a result.

Boanas continued his work with the Surrey FA as The County Coach, and was then approached for the position of assistant director of the David Beckham Academy. 
He currently holds an honorary position as the English national colleges head coach.

Boanas  returned  to the women's game in June 2008, being appointed manager of Millwall Lionesses.

In January 2009, he was appointed as manager of the Estonia women's national football team and further tasked with re-structuring youth development and coach education in a developing football nation.

In September 2012 after achieving all his senior coaching qualifications in the UK, Boanas elected to achieve his UEFA Pro Licence in Europe, under Dutch tutor Arno Pijpers.

In November 2012, Boanas reportedly agreed a three-year contract to take over as manager of Lincoln Ladies, to begin in January 2013. However Boanas decided not to take up the position offered at Lincoln.

Boanas is the author of three youth development manuals for coaches and delivers coach education courses and clinics worldwide and also academy training workshops for Surrey coaches with Fulham FC youth academy players.

Boanas was named head coach of Watford FC Ladies on 7 February 2017, before leaving in December 2017.

Boanas is then became head coach of Barking Abbey Girls' Football Academy at Barking Abbey School.

Personal life

Boanas is married to former England and Charlton Athletic goalkeeper Pauline Cope and has two children Sonny and Kari Boanas.

Honours
UK

Ryman League Division Two: 1
2000–01

2003–2004

Nationwide Coach of the Year

2004–2005

Ryman League Coach of the Year
FA Women's Cup: 1
2004–05
FA Women's Premier League Cup: 2
2003–04, 2005–06

Europe

Estonia

2009, 2010, 2012, 2013 Seniors 4 x Winners Annual Baltic Cup Tournament

2009, 2012 U19s 2 x Winners Youth Baltic Cup

2010, 2012, 2013 U17s 3 x Winners Youth Baltic Cup

2010 Voted Estonian FA JALKA Magazine Coach of the year

2010 Seniors Winners UEFA Mini Tournament Armenia

References

External links
Coaching profile

English Soccer School
Centre Of Football Excellence SE Asia
Surrey Football Coaches Association UK
Euro-Asian Association Of Football Coaches

1959 births
Living people
English footballers
English football managers
Tooting & Mitcham United F.C. players
Tooting & Mitcham United F.C. managers
Charlton Athletic F.C. non-playing staff
Expatriate football managers in Estonia
Estonia women's national football team managers
Association football defenders